Máximo González and Roberto Maytín were the defending champions but only González chose to defend his title, partnering Sergio Galdós. González successfully defended his title, defeating Rogério Dutra Silva and Fabrício Neis 6–3, 5–7, [14–12] in the final.

Seeds

Draw

References
 Main Draw

Campeonato Internacional de Tenis de Santos - Doubles